Signe Paisjärv was a female former international table tennis player from Estonia.

Table tennis career
She won a silver medal at the 1967 World Table Tennis Championships in the Corbillon Cup (women's team event) with Svetlana Grinberg, Laima Balaišytė and Zoja Rudnova for the Soviet Union.

She won 18 Estonian National titles: 10 gold (including the 1964 and 1967 singles), 3 silver and 5 bronze.

Personal life
She married Jüri Talu in 1968.

See also
 List of World Table Tennis Championships medalists

References

External links
Biography at ESBL 

1940 births
Estonian female table tennis players
Soviet table tennis players
Sportspeople from Tallinn
Living people
World Table Tennis Championships medalists